The South Africa women's cricket team toured England to play against the England women's cricket team in June and July 2022. Originally, South Africa were scheduled to tour England in September 2020. The tour was scheduled to consist of four Women's One Day Internationals (WODIs) and two Women's Twenty20 Internationals (WT20Is), with all the matches taking place at the County Cricket Ground in Derby. However, in August 2020, the tour was cancelled due to the COVID-19 pandemic. In February 2022, the England and Wales Cricket Board (ECB) announced a new schedule for the tour, consisting of three WODI matches, three WT20I matches, and a one-off Women's Test match. It was South Africa Women's first Test match since they played India in November 2014. A points-based system was used across all three formats of the tour.

For the one-off Test match, England fielded four debutants, while South Africa had nine of their players earn their maiden Test cap. Batting first, Marizanne Kapp scored 150 runs before South Africa were bowled out for 284 by the close of play on day one. In reply, England made 417/8 before declaring their innings, with Nat Sciver and Alice Davidson-Richards both making centuries. However, across days three and four multiple rain interruptions meant the match ended in a draw. Nat Sciver was named as the player of the match for her 169 not out.

England won the first WODI by five wickets, with Emma Lamb scoring her first century in an international match. In the second match, Sophia Dunkley also scored her first century in WODI cricket. England won the match by 114 runs to win the WODI series with a match to play. England won the third WODI by 109 runs to win the series 3–0.

England won the opening WT20I match by six wickets, with Katherine Brunt taking her 100th wicket in the format. The win meant that England won the points-based series, taking an unassailable 10–2 lead into the final two matches of the tour. Nat Sciver captained England for the second WT20I, after Heather Knight was ruled out of the match with a hip injury. England won the match by six wickets, to win the WT20I series with one match left to play. Katherine Brunt became England's leading wicket-taker in WT20I cricket, taking her 103rd dismissal in the format. England won the third WT20I by 38 runs, winning the series 3–0, and finished the tour 14–2 winners on points.

Background
In April 2020, England's series against the India women's cricket team was postponed due to the COVID-19 pandemic. A month later, Clare Connor, the Director of Cricket for the England and Wales Cricket Board (ECB), suggested that this tour could become a tri-series with India and South Africa. On 18 June 2020, the ECB named a squad of 24 players to who will return to training, with ongoing discussions with the Board of Control for Cricket in India (BCCI) and Cricket South Africa (CSA) about a possible tri-series. On 6 July 2020, the ECB confirmed discussions were still ongoing to host the matches, behind closed doors. However, on 20 July 2020, reports stated that India would not tour, due to the impact of the pandemic in India, with the ECB looking to add further matches between England and South Africa.

When the ECB published the original fixtures for the tour in January 2020, the matches were scheduled to be played at six different venues around England. On 21 July 2020, the ECB announced that all the fixtures would take place at the County Cricket Ground in Derby. All of the team's training will also take place at the venue, in a bio-secure environment. As a result, Derbyshire County Cricket Club will play their Championship matches away from home when the season starts. On 23 July 2020, Cricket South Africa named a 24-woman squad to begin training in Pretoria ahead of the series. During the first week of August, England women played warm-up matches in Derby.

On 15 August 2020, the ECB confirmed that they were also in talks with Cricket West Indies. The West Indies women's cricket team could tour England in place of the South African team, due to an increase in coronavirus restrictions in South Africa. On 18 August 2020, Cricket South Africa confirmed that their women's team would not be travelling to England due to the pandemic. Despite the cancellation, the ECB also confirmed they were in talks with other cricket boards to host a possible tour in a bio-secure environment. On 25 August 2020, the ECB confirmed that the West Indies women's team would be touring England.

Squads

Issy Wong was initially named as a travelling reserve for England Women's Test team. On 25 June 2022, Wong was added to England's Test squad, after Emily Arlott was ruled out of the match after not recovering from COVID-19. Prior to the WODI matches, South Africa's Lizelle Lee announced her retirement from international cricket. Ahead of the second ODI, Masabata Klaas and Delmi Tucker were added to South Africa's squad for the remaining matches of the series. For the WT20I series, Marizanne Kapp and Tumi Sekhukhune were both ruled out of South Africa's squad with Tazmin Brits added to their team.

Warm-up matches

Only WTest

WODI series

1st WODI

2nd WODI

3rd WODI

WT20I series

1st WT20I

2nd WT20I

3rd WT20I

Notes

References

External links
 Series home at ESPN Cricinfo

Women's cricket tours of England
2020 in South African cricket
2022 in South African cricket
2020 in English cricket
2022 in English cricket
International cricket competitions in 2022
England 2022
cricket
2022 in women's cricket
South Africa women's cricket team in England in 2020